Ashenden State Forest, sometimes written as Ashendon State Forest, is a  protected area in the town of Warner, New Hampshire. It was donated to the state by Katharine Brown. She subsequently donated an easement on an adjacent  including a historic farmhouse. Brown died in 2005. Ashenden State Forest is located south of Cunningham Pond, the Chandler Reservation, and the Harriman Chandler State Forest.

See also

List of New Hampshire state forests

References

Geography of New Hampshire
New Hampshire state forests
Merrimack County, New Hampshire